The 2013 Arkansas Razorbacks football team represented the University of Arkansas during the 2013 NCAA Division I FBS football season. The Razorbacks played their home games at Donald W. Reynolds Razorback Stadium in Fayetteville and War Memorial Stadium in Little Rock, Arkansas. They played as a member of the Western Division of the Southeastern Conference.

Preseason
Bret Bielema was hired as Arkansas's head football coach on December 4, leaving the same position with the Wisconsin Badgers. The move surprised many, including Wisconsin athletic director Barry Alvarez. It was announced Wisconsin defensive coordinator Chris Ash would take the same position at Arkansas on December 11.

Schedule

Game summaries

Louisiana–Lafayette

(Q1, 8:24) ARK – Javontee Herndon 6-yard pass from Brandon Allen, Zach Hocker kick
(Q2, 13:58) ULL – Alonzo Harris 2-yard rush, Stephen Brauchle kick
(Q2, 11:30) ARK – Javontee Herndon 49-yard pass from Brandon Allen, Zach Hocker kick
(Q2, 5:18) ARK – Zach Hocker 22-yard field goal
(Q2, 0:00) ARK – Zach Hocker 34-yard field goal
(Q3, 8:39) ARK – Kiero Small 10-yard pass from Brandon Allen, Zach Hocker kick
(Q3, 6:20) ULL – Jacob Maxwell 11-yard pass from Terrance Broadway, Stephen Brauchle kick
(Q3, 6:04) ARK – Jonathan Williams 75-yard rush, Zach Hocker kick

Samford

(Q1, 12:02) ARK – Mitchell Loewen 24-yard pass from Brandon Allen, Zach Hocker kick
(Q1, 7:36) ARK – Javontee Herndon 7-yard pass from Brandon Allen, Zach Hocker kick
(Q1, 1:36) SAM – Kelsey Pope 2-yard rush, Warren Handrahan kick
(Q2, 11:54) ARK – Zach Hocker 54-yard field goal
(Q3, 11:22) SAM – Zeke Walters 2-yard pass from Andy Summerlin, Warren Handrahan kick
(Q3, 5:09) SAM – Fabian Truss 16-yard rush, Warren Handrahan kick
(Q4, 13:38) ARK – Jonathan Williams 1-yard rush, Zach Hocker kick
(Q4, 9:04) ARK – Alex Collins 2-yard rush, Zach Hocker kick

Southern Miss

(Q1, 3:52) ARK – Brandon Allen 5-yard rush, Zach Hocker kick
(Q2, 12:01) USM – Corey Acosta 27-yard field goal
(Q2, 6:05) ARK – Zach Hocker 42-yard field goal
(Q3, 7:29) ARK – Jonathan Williams 45-yard rush, Zach Hocker kick
(Q4, 7:20) ARK – Alex Collins 7-yard rush, Zach Hocker kick

at Rutgers

(Q1, 1:51) ARK – Zach Hocker 41-yard field goal
(Q1, 0:21) ARK – Tevin Mitchel 26-yard interception return, Zach Hocker kick
(Q2, 0:39) RUTG – Tyler Kroft 15-yard pass from Gary Nova, Nick Borgese kick
(Q3, 10:01) ARK – Javontee Herndon 17-yard pass from A.J. Derby, Zach Hocker kick
(Q3, 8:38) ARK – Hunter Henry 21-yard pass from Jonathan Williams, Zach Hocker kick
(Q3, 2:14) RUTG – Janarion Grant 58-yard punt return, Nick Borgese kick
(Q4, 9:55) RUTG – Leonte Carroo 33-yard pass from Gary Nova, Nick Borgese kick
(Q4, 5:18) RUTG – Leonte Carroo 4-yard pass from Gary Nova, Nick Borgese kick

vs. No. 10 Texas A&M

(Q1, 12:21) A&M – Mike Evans 9-yard pass from Johnny Manziel, Josh Lambo kick
(Q1, 7:43) ARK – Keon Hatcher 12-yard pass from Brandon Allen, Zach Hocker kick
(Q1, 5:11) A&M – Ben Malena 2-yard rush, Josh Lambo kick
(Q1, 1:47) A&M – Josh Lambo 39-yard field goal
(Q2, 14:44) ARK – Zach Hocker 28-yard field goal
(Q2, 11:14) A&M – Mike Evans 7-yard pass from Johnny Manziel, Josh Lambo kick
(Q2, 6:02) ARK – Jonathan Williams 19-yard pass from Brandon Allen, Zach Hocker kick
(Q2, 0:00) ARK – Zach Hocker 39-yard field goal
(Q3, 14:19) A&M – Deshazor Everett 34-yard interception return, Josh Lambo kick
(Q3, 12:43) ARK – Alex Collins 9-yard rush, Zach Hocker kick
(Q3, 4:42) A&M – Trey Williams 17-yard rush, Josh Lambo kick
(Q3, 1:09) ARK – Javontee Herndon 19-yard pass from Brandon Allen
(Q4, 10:08) A&M – Ben Malena 1-yard rush, Josh Lambo kick

at No. 18 Florida

(Q1, 2:09) ARK – Jonathan Williams 4-yard rush, Zach Hocker kick
(Q2, 11:11) FLA – Brad Phillips 28-yard field goal
(Q2, 8:33) FLA – Loucheiz Purifoy 42-yard interception return, Brad Phillips kick
(Q2, 0:20) FLA – Solomon Patton 51-yard pass from Tyler Murphy, Brad Phillips kick
(Q3, 11:23) FLA – Solomon Patton 38-yard pass from Tyler Murphy, Brad Phillips kick
(Q3, 4:12) ARK – Zach Hocker 30-yard field goal
(Q4, 4:47) FLA – Valdez Showers 9-yard pass from Tyler Murphy

No. 14 South Carolina

(Q1, 12:02) ARK – Alex Collins 6-yard rush, Zach Hocker kick
(Q1, 7:14) SC – Elliot Fry 33-yard field goal
(Q1, 5:12) SC – Mike Davis 6-yard rush, Elliot Fry kick
(Q2, 13:40) SC – Bruce Ellington 9-yard pass from Connor Shaw, Elliot Fry kick
(Q2, 0:13) SC – Bruce Ellington 4-yard pass from Connor Shaw, Elliot Fry kick
(Q3, 11:49) SC – Damiere Byrd 45-yard pass from Connor Shaw, Elliot Fry
(Q3, 1:29) SC – Connor Shaw 10-yard rush, Elliot Fry kick
(Q4, 9:18) SC – Kane Whitehurst 15-yard pass from Dylan Thompson, Elliot Fry kick
(Q4, 1:07) SC –  Brendan Nosovitch 7-yard rush, Elliot Fry kick

at No. 1 Alabama

(Q1, 9:09) BAMA – Jalston Fowler 4-yard pass from A.J. McCarron, Cade Foster kick
(Q1, 4:36) BAMA – Kenyan Drake 1-yard rush, Cade Foster kick
(Q2, 9:03) BAMA – Kenyan Drake 46-yard rush, Cade Foster kick
(Q2, 1:07) BAMA – Amari Cooper 30-yard pass from A.J. McCarron, Cade Foster kick
(Q3, 13:28) BAMA – O. J. Howard 17-yard pass from A.J. McCarron, Cade Foster kick
(Q3, 8:18) BAMA – T. J. Yeldon 24-yard rush, Cade Foster kick
(Q3, 3:02) BAMA – Cade Foster 48-yard field goal
(Q4, 0:59) BAMA – Derrick Henry 80-yard rush, Adam Griffith kick

No. 8 Auburn

(Q1, 2:35) AUB – Tre Mason 9-yard rush, Cody Parkey kick
(Q2, 12:52) ARK – Zach Hocker 34-yard field goal
(Q2, 10:53) AUB – Tre Mason 4-yard rush, Cody Parkey kick
(Q3, 10:52) AUB – Tre Mason 5-yard rush, Cody Parkey kick
(Q3, 6:39) AUB – Sammie Coates 88-yard pass from Nick Marshall, Cody Parkey kick
(Q3, 6:11) ARK – Keon Hatcher 13-yard pass from Brandon Allen, Zach Hocker kick
(Q4, 14:54) ARK – Kiero Small 2-yard rush, Zach Hocker kick
(Q4, 10:17) AUB – Tre Mason 12-yard rush, Cody Parkey kick

at Ole Miss

(Q1, 12:14) ARK – Zach Hocker 51-yard field goal
(Q1, 8:24) MISS – Andrew Ritter 42-yard field goal
(Q1, 1:28) MISS – Barry Brunetti 1-yard rush, Andrew Ritter kick
(Q2, 10:18) MISS – Andrew Ritter 19-yard field goal
(Q2, 2:43) ARK – Hunter Henry 17-yard pass from Brandon Allen, Zach Hocker kick
(Q2, 0:42) MISS – Laquon Treadwell 14-yard pass from Bo Wallace, Andrew Ritter kick
(Q3, 11:29) ARK – Kiero Small 1-yard rush, Zach Hocker kick
(Q3, 4:11) MISS – Ja-Mes Logan 75-yard pass from Bo Wallace, Andrew Ritter kick
(Q3, 1:05) MISS – Donte Moncrief 52-yard pass from Bo Wallace, Andrew Ritter kick
(Q4, 4:57) ARK – Julian Horton 20-yard pass from Brandon Allen, Zach Hocker kick

Mississippi State

(Q1, 11:02) ARK – Javontee Herndon 8-yard rush, Zach Hocker kick
(Q2, 6:53) ARK – Zach Hocker 54-yard field goal
(Q2, 5:08) MSST – Devon Bell 24-yard field goal
(Q2, 1:48) MSST – Ladarius Perkins 30-yard pass from Tyler Russell, Devon Bell kick
(Q3, 3:28) ARK – Julian Horton 22-yard rush, Zach Hocker kick
(Q4, 13:35) MSST – Jameon Lewis 5-yard pass from Tyler Russell, Devon Bell kick
(OT) MSST – Damian Williams 25-yard rush, Devon Bell kick

at No. 15 LSU

(Q1, 11:15) LSU – Terrence Magee 29-yard rush, Colby Delahoussaye kick
(Q1, 6:26) ARK – Kiero Small 3-yard rush, Zach Hocker kick
(Q1, 3:38) LSU – Terrence Magee 23-yard rush, Colby Delahoussaye kick
(Q2, 6:14) ARK – Hunter Henry 9-yard pass from Brandon Allen, Zach Hocker kick
(Q2, 0:00) ARK – Zach Hocker 20-yard field goal
(Q3, 9:27) ARK – Zach Hocker 28-yard field goal
(Q3, 7:35) LSU – Jeremy Hill 52-yard rush, Colby Delahoussaye kick
(Q3, 0:50) ARK – Hunter Henry 2-yard pass from Brandon Allen, Zach Hocker kick
(Q4, 4:56) LSU – Colby Delahoussaye 37-yard field goal
(Q4, 1:15) LSU – Travin Dural 49-yard pass from Anthony Jennings, Colby Delahoussaye kick

Rankings

References

Arkansas
Arkansas Razorbacks football seasons
Arkansas Razorbacks football